Complete list of Kuba Kingdom rulers:

 Bumba (c. 550 CE)
 Loko Yima
 Lobamba
 Woto
 Nyimi Longa
 Minga Bengela
 Go Kadi
 Bonga Mashu Mashi
 Bashan Chamba
 Pisha Pasha
 Kome Pasha
 Shongo Pasha
 Chenje Pasha
 Isango Pasha
 Kumi Pasha
 Buye Pasha
 Lophuke Phuke
 Ibuka
 Lambange Bange
 Do Beji
 Tono Kola
 Dima Kola 
 Do Kola
 Djo Da
 Din Da
 Bon Go
 Muchu Mushanga
 Ibama
 Lusanga
 Lusanga Lupemi
 Ba Phinga
 Phinga Bata
 Yomen Bomo
 Chele Miele
 Ba Ngama
 Kose
 Pena
 Bisha Mushanga Matunu
 Guba Sanga
 Lolaka Nasakari Motundu
 Gokare
 Sanga Motunu
 Won Che
 Kaman Bosh
 Biri Kaman Bosh
 Itele Bimbiri
 Bire Yomo
 Chile Menge
 Blongonga
 Kase Lubola
 Nyonya Malovo
 Beni Lomo
 Bel Miya
 Sako Tumu
 Gunga Nyonyo
 Muchu Mokama
 Musaba Kama
 Musabukama Pasa
 Denga Muima
 Shama Katuri
 Kusunju
 Bena Misaki
 Bikila Kolo
 Kunche Lama
 Pelama Pena
 Mime Pelama
 Chenge Lesanga
 Mianga
 Sam Bula
 Manchum Bula
 Bopele Bombo
 Boeke
 Bo Kena
 Shamba Nche
 Golo Nche
 Shama Shanga
 Sama Kama
 Ko Kena
 Sanga Lenga
 Bosh Akama
 Kele Kama
 Bole Kama Sanga
 Bolueme
 Bari Moana
 Moy Mope
 Miele
 Boi Pe
 Moshu Moshanga
 Bo Ngo
 Misha Mishanga Mitumba
 Lushanjela Shanga
 Bo Shanga
 Shamba Bolongongo (c. 1600)
 Bongo Lenge
 Golo Bosh
 Boni Bosh
 Kongo Kama Bomanchala
 Bo Kama Bomanchala (solar eclipse in his reign c. 1680)
 Golo Boke
 Bokere Boke
 Kotom Boke
 Golo Shanga
 Misha Mishanga Shanga
 Bokare Che
 Bushabun Che
 Koto Che
 Misha Pelenge Che
 Bope Pelenge I
 Kata Mbula 1776–1810
 Mikope Mbula 1810–1840
 Bope Mobinji 1840–1885
 Mikope Mobinji 1885–1890
 Koto Mboke 1890–1896
 Mishanga Pelenge 1896–1900
 Bope Pelenge II 1900
 Mikope Pelenge 1900
 Mingashanga Bake 1900
 Kwete Kena 1900
 Bope Kena 1900–1901
 Mikope Kena 1901–1902
 Kwete Peshanga Kena (born c. 1873) 1902–1916
 Mbop aMabiinc maMbweeky (Bope Mobinji Boke) 1916–1919 
 Kot aMabiinc maKyeen (Kwete Mobinji Kena) 1919–1939
 Mbop aMabiinc maKyeen (Bope Mobinji Kena) 1939–1969
 Kot aMbweeky aShyaang (Kwete Mboke) 1969–

References

External links
 http://www.worldstatesmen.org/Congo-Kinshasa_native.html

Kuba